The Chemnitz tramway network is a network of tramways forming the centrepiece of the public transport system in Chemnitz, a city in the federal state of Saxony, Germany.

Opened in 1880 as a horsecar system, the network was converted to an electrically powered system between 1893 and 1898. The system is integrated in the Verkehrsverbund Mittelsachsen (VMS).

The city used Czechoslovak Tatra T3 trams (Tatra T3D and Tatra B3D) from 1969 until they were all decommissioned by 2019. Some were sold to Kazakhstan and Russia. In 1993, the city began using Stadler Variobahn, originally built by ABB (ASEA Brown Boveri, now made by Stadler). In 2019, new Škoda 35 T trams were delivered to the city.

Lines 
, the network consists of 9 lines, as follows:

See also
List of town tramway systems in Germany
Trams in Germany

References

External links
 
 Track plan of the Chemnitz tram system
 
 

Chemnitz
Transport in Chemnitz
Chemnitz
Chemnitz
Chemnitz
Chemnitz